Guerric of Igny (c. 1070/80-1157) was a Cistercian abbot. Little is known about his early life. He may have been educated at Tournai's cathedral school, perhaps under Benedictine monk, Odo of Cambrai. Guerric appears to have lived a life of prayer and study near the Tournai Cathedral. His monastic formation was directly influenced by Bernard of Clairvaux, who praises him in several letters. In 1138, he became abbot of Igny Abbey, in the diocese of Rheims, a house dependent on Clairvaux. Here Guerric ruled as abbot until his death on 19 August 1157. It was here that he composed the 54 liturgical sermons that constitute his surviving works.

His spirituality was said to be influenced by Origen. Guerric was raised to the rank of Blessed; his relics are still venerated in Igny.

Further reading
The Christmas Sermons of Bl. Guerric of Igny, trans Sr. Rosa of Lima, with an introduction by Thomas Merton, (Trappist, KY: Abbey of Gethsemani, 1959)
John Morson and Hilary Costello, Guerric d'Igny: Sermons, 2 vols, Sources Chretiennes 166, 202, (Paris: Cerf, 1970, 1973).
Guerric of Igny, Liturgical Sermons: Volume 1, Introduction and Translation by Monks at Mount St Bernard Abbey, Cistercian Fathers series no. 8, (Shannon: Irish University Press, 1971)
Guerric of Igny, Liturgical Sermons: Volume 2, Introduction and Translation by Monks at Mount St Bernard Abbey, Cistercian Fathers series no. 32, (Spencer, MA: Cistercian Publications, 1971)

References

11th-century births
1157 deaths
Cistercian abbots
French abbots
Cistercian saints
French religious writers
French Cistercians
French Christian theologians
12th-century French writers
11th-century French writers
12th-century Latin writers
11th-century Latin writers
Monastic theologians
Medieval French theologians
Catholic Mariology